Cirilo Nassiff (4 November 1905 – 1990) was an Argentine sports shooter. He competed at the 1960 Summer Olympics and the 1964 Summer Olympics.

References

External links
 

1905 births
1990 deaths
Argentine male sport shooters
Olympic shooters of Argentina
Shooters at the 1960 Summer Olympics
Shooters at the 1964 Summer Olympics
Sportspeople from Buenos Aires
Pan American Games gold medalists for Argentina
Pan American Games medalists in shooting
Shooters at the 1951 Pan American Games